The Max Delbrück Medal has been awarded annually from 1992 to 2013 by the Max Delbrück Center for Molecular Medicine (German: Max-Delbrück-Centrum für Molekulare Medizin or MDC). Named after the German biophysicist Max Delbrück, it is presented in Berlin to an outstanding scientist on the occasion of the annual "Berlin Lecture on Molecular Medicine", which the MDC organizes together with other Berlin research institutions and Bayer HealthCare. The award recipient usually delivers a lecture after the award.

Recipients
Source: MDC
 1992: Günter Blobel, Rockefeller University of New York, US
 1993: no award
 1994: Sydney Brenner, Cambridge University, England
 1995: Jean-Pierre Changeux, Pasteur Institute, Paris
 1996: Robert Allan Weinberg, Whitehead Institute, Cambridge, US
 1997: Charles Weissmann, Zürich University, Switzerland
 1998: Svante Pääbo, Max Planck Institute for Evolutionary Anthropology, Leipzig, Germany
 1999: Paul Berg, Stanford University, US
 2000: Joan A. Steitz, Yale University, New Haven, US
 2001: Eric Lander, Whitehead Institute, Cambridge, US
 2002: Roger Tsien, Howard Hughes Medical Institute (HHMI) und University of California, San Diego, La Jolla, US
 2003: , National Institute of Neurological Disorders and Stroke (NINDS), Bethesda, US
 2004: Victor J. Dzau, Duke University, Durham (US)
 2005: Tom Rapoport, Harvard Medical School, Boston/US
 2006: Rudolf Jaenisch, Whitehead Institute and Massachusetts Institute of Technology (MIT), Cambridge/US
 2007: Thomas Tuschl, Rockefeller University in New York, US
 2008: William E. Paul, National Institute of Allergy and Infectious Diseases (NIAID) of the National Institutes of Health (NIH), Bethesda, Maryland, US
 2009: Klaus Rajewsky, Harvard Medical School, Boston, US
 2010: Susan Lindquist, Whitehead Institute for Biomedical Research, Cambridge, Massachusetts, US
 2011: Hans Schöler, Max Planck Institute for Molecular Biomedicine, Münster
 2012: no award?
 2013: Irving Weissman, Stanford University School of Medicine

See also

 List of medicine awards

References

 This article was translated from the equivalent article on the German Wikipedia

Medicine awards
German science and technology awards
Awards established in 1992
1992 establishments in Germany